John Rutter Brooke (July 21, 1838 – September 5, 1926) was one of the last surviving Union generals of the American Civil War when he died at the age of 88.

Early life
Brooke was born in Pottstown, Pennsylvania, and was educated in nearby Collegeville and West Chester.

Civil War
Brooke's military career began when he joined the 4th Pennsylvania Infantry with the rank of captain in April 1861. In August, he became colonel of the newly raised 53rd Pennsylvania Infantry and served in the 1862 Peninsula Campaign.

He temporarily commanded a brigade during the Battle of Antietam in September of that year. In May 1863, he was given permanent command of a brigade of the 1st Division of the II Corps, which he led in the Battle of Chancellorsville and during the Gettysburg Campaign.

On the second day of the Battle of Gettysburg, July 2, 1863, Brooke found himself in the thick of the action when Confederate lieutenant general James Longstreet launched his assault against the Union lines south of Gettysburg. Rushed into action as reinforcements by Maj. Gen. Winfield Hancock, Colonel Brooke launched a limited counterattack against oncoming Confederate forces with his brigade in the Wheatfield. Although he was knocked out of action with a severe wound, his men temporarily stopped the Confederates and stabilized the Union line long enough to prevent a breakthrough.

After recovery, Brooke subsequently also fought in the Overland Campaign, including the Battle of Spotsylvania Court House and other battles. He was promoted to brigadier general of volunteers on May 12, 1864. General Brooke was critically wounded, again, at Cold Harbor in June. Brooke led a division in western Virginia late in the war. He was promoted to brevet major general in the volunteer army on August 1, 1864, for his service at Totopotomoy and Cold Harbor, and to brevet brigadier general in the regular army on March 2, 1867, for Spotsylvania Court House.

Postbellum career
In 1866, Brooke accepted a commission as the lieutenant colonel of the 37th U.S. Infantry of the regular army. Thirteen years later, he was given the position of colonel of the 13th U.S. Infantry, serving on the frontier in various posts.

In 1888, he was promoted to brigadier general and was in command of the Department of the Platte when the Ghost Dance began in 1890. He was ordered by General Nelson Miles to rush the 7th U.S. Cavalry up to Wounded Knee. He left this command in 1895.

In 1897, he was promoted to major general in the Regular Army and assigned to command the I Corps during the Spanish–American War. In Puerto Rico, he landed in Arroyo with General Hains, and reached Guayama by the time the armistice was signed. When General Miles left the island in October 1898 to return to the United States, Brooke became military governor and head of the army of occupation in the U.S. military government. On the December 6, Brooke was replaced by General Guy Vernor Henry, and by December 13, was named to the same position in Cuba.

General Brooke was a member of the Military Order of the Loyal Legion of the United States (Companion #02434) and served as its national commander-in-chief from 1905 to 1907. He was also a member of the Minnesota Society of Colonial Wars and the Military Order of Foreign Wars.

General Brooke retired from the Army on July 21, 1902, in Philadelphia, where he lived until his death at age 88 in 1926. He is buried at Arlington National Cemetery.

Family
In 1863, Brooke married Louisa H. Roberts of Warwick, Pennsylvania.  She died in 1867, and in 1877 he married Mary L. Stearns, the daughter of Governor Onslow Stearns.  With his first wife, Brooke was the father of two sons, William and Louis.

Legacy
The troop transport , launched February 1943, was named in his honor. The former U.S. Army military post in San Juan, P.R., which encompassed El Morro Castle was named Fort Brooke in his honor.

See also

 List of American Civil War generals (Union)

Notes

References
 Eicher, John H., and David J. Eicher. Civil War High Commands. Stanford, CA: Stanford University Press, 2001. .
 Military Album of Commissioned Officers in the Spanish–American War, Library of Congress
 "Gen. J. R. Brooke Comes to Atlanta." Atlanta Constitution. May 18, 1898, p. 5.

External links
 The John Rutter Brooke Papers, including correspondence, accounts, regimental reports, military orders and pamphlets that pertain to his military career, are available for research use at the Historical Society of Pennsylvania.
 Arlington National Cemetery
 
 Crónica de la guerra hispano-americana en Puerto Rico - page 2  (in Spanish)

1838 births
1926 deaths
Burials at Arlington National Cemetery
Governors of Puerto Rico
Colonial heads of Cuba
Military history of Puerto Rico
Political history of Puerto Rico
People of Pennsylvania in the American Civil War
Military personnel from Philadelphia
Pine Ridge Campaign
American military personnel of the Spanish–American War
Union Army generals
United States military governors